Afreumenes aterrimus is a species of wasp in the family Vespidae. It was described by Schulthess in 1910.

Subspecies
 Afreumenes aterrimus bicoloratus Giordani Soika, 1987
 Afreumenes aterrimus aterrimus (Schulthess, 1910)
 Afreumenes aterrimus pseudomelanosoma Giordani Soika, 1968

References

Potter wasps
Insects described in 1910